Vrané nad Vltavou is a municipality and village in Prague-West District in the Central Bohemian Region of the Czech Republic. It has about 2,600 inhabitants. It lies on the Vltava river.

References

Villages in Prague-West District